Helen Brodie Cowan Bannerman ( Watson; 25 February 1862 – 13 October 1946) was a Scottish author of children's books. She is best known for her first book, Little Black Sambo (1899).

Life

Bannerman was born at 35 Royal Terrace, Edinburgh. She was the eldest daughter and fourth child of seven children of Robert Boog Watson (1823–1910), minister of the Free Church of Scotland and malacologist, and his wife Janet (1831–1912), daughter of Helen Brodie and the papermaker and philanthropist Alexander Cowan. Between the ages of 2 and 12, she lived in Madeira, where her father was minister at the Scottish church. When the family returned, they spent much time with their maternal aunt, Mrs Cowan, at 35 Royal Terrace on Calton Hill.

Because women were not admitted into Scottish universities, she sat external examinations set by the University of St. Andrews, attaining the qualification of Lady Literate in Arts (LLA) in 1887. She then married Dr William Burney Bannerman, a physician and an officer in the Indian Medical Service (IMS). The couple then moved to India in 1889, taking up residence in Madras (modern-day Chennai), capital of the state of Tamil Nadu on the southeastern seacoast, populated mostly by the Tamil ethnic group. During their 30 years in India, they had four children: daughters Janet (b. 1893) and Day (b. 1896), and sons James "Pat" Patrick (b.1900) and Robert (b. 1902). 

She died in Edinburgh in 1946 of cerebral thrombosis. She is buried with her husband in Grange Cemetery in south Edinburgh.

She was the grandmother of the physicist Tom Kibble, who discovered the Higgs–Kibble mechanism and the Higgs boson.

Works
The illustrations and settings of Bannerman's books are all about Indians and their culture. Little Black Sambo has ghee, tigers, and a bazaar, The Story of Little Black Mingo has jungle, a mugger (a kind of crocodile), a dhobi, and a mongoose, Little Black Quasha has a bazaar and tigers, and The Story of Little Black Quibba has mangoes and elephants.

 The Story of Little Black Sambo, 1899
 Story of Little Black Mingo, 1901
 The Story of Little Black Quibba, 1902
 Little Degchie-Head: An Awful Warning to Bad Babas, 1903
 Little Kettle-Head, 1904
 Pat and the Spider, 1905
 The Story of the Teasing Monkey, 1907
 Little Black Quasha, 1908
 Story of Little Black Bobtail, 1909
 Sambo and the Twins, 1936
 The Story of Little White Squibba, 1966 Finished by her daughter

See also

Golliwogg

References

External links

 
 
 
Helen Bannerman biography 
Helen Bannerman in SterlingTimes
The Story of Little Black Sambo in SterlingTimes

1862 births
1946 deaths
writers from Edinburgh
Alumni of the University of St Andrews
Scottish children's writers